William Mather Rutherford Pringle (22 January 1874 – 1 April 1928) was a Liberal Party politician in the United Kingdom who served as a Member of Parliament (MP) from 1910 to 1918 and again from 1922 to 1924.

Pringle was educated at Glasgow University and was called to the Bar of the Middle Temple in 1904.

Pringle's son, also William Pringle later became a politician and trade unionist.

Political career
He first stood for parliament at the 1906 elections;

Pringle was elected as member for Lanarkshire North West in January 1910. It was an exceptional result as it was one of only a handful of gains made by the Liberal party at those elections, and achieved, despite the presence of a Labour candidate. 

In 1914, as a back-bench Liberal MP, he supported Britain going to war in Europe but he opposed the introduction of Conscription being planned by Asquith. Although Pringle remained a supporter of the party led by Asquith, he was very critical of the party leader during the war. After the war, he returned to being a strong supporter of Asquith. He was described as "one of the ablest Parliamentary tacticians of the 20th Century" and also as "one of the most intransigeant and pertinacious of anti-Lloyd George Liberals". In 1916, when Lloyd George took over as Prime Minister, Pringle, along with James Hogge, became the most vocal critics of the Prime Minister from the Liberal benches. After the war, the Pringle-Hogge partnership ended when Pringle became a loyal supporter of Asquith, while Hogge looked to Lloyd George for peacetime inspiration. His Lanarkshire seat was abolished as part of the boundary changes for the 1918 elections, so he had to look for a new seat. Standing as a Liberal without the support from the Coalition government, he unsuccessfully contested Glasgow Springburn at the 1918 general election 

He sought a return to parliament at Rusholme at a by-election in 1919. During the Rusholme by-election, he declared for a Capital Levy which was not party policy.

Still keen to return to parliament, he fought another by-election;

At the 1922 general election he was elected as Member of Parliament for Penistone in Yorkshire, defeating the sitting Labour MP William Gillis, who had narrowly beaten Pringle to win the seat at a by-election in 1921. 

Pringle held the seat in 1923, 

By 1924 he had become a member of Asquith's Liberal Shadow Cabinet, and he was a vocal critic of the Labour Government, accusing it of not getting ahead with reforming measures. He was defeated at the 1924 general election by Labour's Rennie Smith;

After his election defeat in 1924, Pringle led Liberal candidate criticisms of Lloyd George for failing to make sufficient money from the Lloyd George Fund available to help the Liberal campaign. He helped to form the Liberal and Radical Candidates Association, becoming its inaugural Chairman and argued that this body should be part of the process in electing the next Chairman of the Liberal Parliamentary party. He hoped that this would help prevent Lloyd George taking that position but Asquith, now out of parliament, did not support his proposal and Lloyd George took over as Chairman.

He stood in the 1925 Ayr Burghs by-election, but finished a poor third 

After Lloyd George took over as Leader from Asquith, Pringle put his efforts into a newly created body called the Liberal Council, which sought to rally those in the Liberal Party who opposed Lloyd George. He did not stand for Parliament again and died in 1928 aged 54.

References

External links
 
Parliamentary Archives, The Political Papers of William Mather Rutherford Pringle, MP

1874 births
1928 deaths
Alumni of the University of Glasgow
Members of the Middle Temple
Members of the Parliament of the United Kingdom for Scottish constituencies
Scottish Liberal Party MPs
UK MPs 1910
UK MPs 1910–1918
Liberal Party (UK) MPs for English constituencies
UK MPs 1922–1923
UK MPs 1923–1924
Politics of Penistone